The Victims of Trafficking and Violence Protection Act of 2000 (TVPA) is a federal statute passed into law in 2000 by the U.S. Congress and signed by President Clinton. The law was later reauthorized by presidents Bush, Obama, and Trump. In addition to its applicability to US citizens, it has the ability to authorize protections for undocumented immigrants who are victims of severe forms of trafficking and violence.

History
The Trafficking Victims Protection Act was subsequently renewed in 2003, 2006, 2008 (when it was renamed the William Wilberforce Trafficking Victims Protection Reauthorization Act of 2008). The law lapsed in 2011. 
In 2013, the entirety of the Trafficking Victims Protection was attached as an amendment to the Violence Against Women Act and passed. There are two stipulations an applicant has to meet in order to receive the benefits of the T-Visa. First, a victim of trafficking must prove/admit to being a victim of a severe form of trafficking and second must be a part of the prosecution of his or her trafficker.  This law does not apply to immigrants seeking admission to the United States for other immigration purposes.

 reauthorized the TVPA in 2018, as part of the Trafficking Victims Protection Act of 2017.

Since the law requires the applicant to become part of the prosecution of his or her trafficker, trafficked persons may be fearful of retaliation upon the self or the family and thus serves as a major deterrent to individuals even considering application.  The law contains provisions for protection of those who are categorized as victims of human trafficking, primarily for sex, smuggling, and forced labor forms of exploitation.

The TVPA allowed for the establishment of the Department of State's Office to Monitor and Combat Trafficking in Persons, which coordinates with foreign governments to protect trafficking victims, prevent trafficking, and prosecute traffickers.

Amendments

Proposed
Justice for Victims of Trafficking Act of 2013 - this bill established in the Treasury the Domestic Trafficking Victims' Fund into which such penalties shall be deposited and which shall be used in FY2015-FY2019 to award grants or enhance victims' programming under the Trafficking Victims Protection Act of 2000, the Trafficking Victims Protection Reauthorization Act of 2005, and the Victims of Child Abuse Act of 1990. The bill also amended the Trafficking Victims Protection Act of 2000 to direct the United States Secretary of Health and Human Services (HHS) to make a determination, based on credible evidence, that a covered individual (i.e., a U.S. citizen or a permanent resident) has been a victim of a severe form of trafficking. It was scheduled to be voted on in the House on May 20, 2014 under a suspension of the rules.
Human Trafficking Prevention Act - this bill required regular training and briefings for some federal government personnel to raise awareness of human trafficking and help employees spot cases of it.

Determinations
On September 27, 2016, President Barack Obama made a Presidential determination on Foreign Governments' Efforts Regarding Trafficking in Persons Consistent with section 110 of the Trafficking Victims Protection Act of 2000 (the "Act") (22 U.S.C. 7107).

On September 30, 2017, President Donald Trump made a Presidential determination under  (Respect to the Efforts of Foreign Governments Regarding Trafficking in Persons).

See also
 Bureau of International Labor Affairs
 Child Soldiers Prevention Act
 Human trafficking in the United States
 Office to Monitor and Combat Trafficking in Persons
 United States Department of State
 Thirteenth Amendment to the United States Constitution

References

Further reading

External links
 Division A: Trafficking Victims Protection Act of 2000
 As codified in 22 U.S.C. chapter 78 of the United States Code from the LII
 As codified in 22 U.S.C. chapter 78 of the United States Code from the US House of Representatives
 Victims of Trafficking and Violence Protection Act of 2000 as amended (PDF/details) in the GPO Statute Compilations collection
 INVOLUNTARY SERVITUDE, FORCED LABOR, and SEX TRAFFICKING STATUTES ENFORCED at the Department of Justice

United States federal criminal legislation
United States federal immigration and nationality legislation
Human trafficking in the United States
Acts of the 106th United States Congress